Charlevoix-Saguenay was a former provincial electoral district in the province of Quebec, Canada.

It was created for the 1912 election from parts of the Charlevoix and Chicoutimi-Saguenay districts. Its final election was in 1944.  It disappeared in the 1948 election and its successor electoral districts were Charlevoix and Saguenay.

Members of the Legislative Assembly
 Pierre D'Auteuil, Conservative Party (1912–1919)
 Philippe Dufour, Liberal (1919–1927)
 Edgar Rochette, Liberal (1927–1936)
 Arthur Leclerc Union Nationale (1936–1939)
 Edgar Rochette, Liberal (1939–1944)
 Arthur Leclerc, Union Nationale (1944-1948)

External links
 Election results (National Assembly)
 Election results (Quebecpolitique.com)

Former provincial electoral districts of Quebec